DoubleTree by Hilton Hotel Portland is a hotel in Portland, Oregon's Lloyd District, in the United States.

Built in 1961, the hotel is one of the five largest in Portland with 477 guest rooms, as of 2020. The property also has restaurants, a covered parking garage and a conference center.  The hotel's outdoor pool, among few in Portland, can accommodate approximately 20 to 30 people. Lizzy Acker included DoubleTree in The Oregonian 2016 list of Portland's best outdoor hotel pools. 

In 2019, a man filed a lawsuit against the hotel claiming he was racially profiled during his stay in 2018.

References

External links 

 DoubleTree by Hilton Hotel Portland at Hilton.com
 DoubleTree by Hilton–Portland at Fodor's
 Doubletree by Hilton Portland at Travel Weekly

1961 establishments in Oregon
DoubleTree hotels
Hotel buildings completed in 1961
Hotels in Portland, Oregon
Lloyd District, Portland, Oregon
Northeast Portland, Oregon